Goya, a Story of Solitude (Spanish: Goya, historia de una soledad) is a 1971 Spanish historical drama film directed by Nino Quevedo. It was entered into the 1971 Cannes Film Festival. The film was heavily cut by censors before its release. It portrays the life of the Spanish artist Francisco Goya.

Cast

 Francisco Rabal - Goya
 Irina Demick - Duchess of Alba
 Jacques Perrin
 José María Prada
 Teresa del Río
 Hugo Blanco
 María Asquerino
 Merche Abreu
 Barta Barri
 Enriqueta Carballeira
 Manuel de Blas
 Inma de Santis
 José Espinosa
 Rosario García Ortega
 Montserrat Julió
 Gerardo Malla
 Sergio Mendizábal
 Ricardo Merino
 Jeannine Mestre
 Luis Morris
 Marisa Paredes
 Teresa Rabal

References

Bibliography
 Bentley, Bernard. A Companion to Spanish Cinema. Boydell & Brewer 2008.

External links

1971 films
1971 drama films
Spanish historical drama films
1970s Spanish-language films
1970s historical drama films
Films directed by Nino Quevedo
Films set in the 19th century
Films set in Madrid
Biographical films about painters
Cultural depictions of Francisco Goya
1970s Spanish films